The 2003 LG Cup was a professional ranking snooker tournament that took place between 4 and 12 October 2003 at the Guild Hall in Preston, England.

Mark Williams won the 15th ranking title of his career by defeating John Higgins 9–5 in the final. In the 11th frame of the final, Higgins made his 3rd maximum in professional competition.

Chris Small came into the tournament as defending champion, however he lost 5–3 to John Parrott in the quarter-finals.

Tournament summary 

Defending champion Chris Small was the number 1 seed with World Champion Mark Williams seeded 2. The remaining places were allocated to players based on the world rankings.

Prize fund
The breakdown of prize money for this year is shown below:

Winner: £82,500
Final: £42,500
Semi-final: £21,500
Quarter-final: £11,800
Last 16: £9,700
Last 32: £7,600
Last 48: £4,200
Last 64: £3,100

Last 80: £2,200
Last 96: £1,500
Stage one highest break: £1,800
Stage two highest break: £5,000
Stage one maximum break: £5,000
Stage two maximum break: £20,000
Total: £597,200

Main draw

Final

Qualifying
Qualifying for the tournament took place between 4 and 18 September 2003 at Pontin's in Prestatyn, Wales.

Round 1
Best of 9 frames

Round 2–4

Century breaks

Qualifying stage centuries

 136, 102  Brian Morgan
 133  Ian Brumby
 128, 116  Ding Junhui
 123  Patrick Wallace
 118  Bradley Jones
 117, 111  Adrian Rosa
 115  Martin Dziewialtowski
 115  Stephen Maguire
 114, 100  Kwan Poomjang
 114  Johl Younger
 112  Darryn Walker

 108, 104  Atthasit Mahitthi
 108  Michael Judge
 107  Ricky Walden
 106  Mark Davis
 105  Bjorn Haneveer
 104  Andrew Norman
 102  Barry Hawkins
 101  Jamie Cope
 101  Rory McLeod
 100  Billy Snaddon
 100  Stuart Pettman

Televised stage centuries

 147, 142, 104  John Higgins
 140, 109, 100  Ken Doherty
 137  John Parrott
 127  Mark Williams
 122, 102  Stephen Lee
 111, 110  Ali Carter
 107  Robin Hull

 104  Marco Fu
 103  Peter Ebdon
 102  Gerard Greene
 102  Joe Perry
 101  Michael Holt
 101  Stephen Hendry
 100  Jimmy White

References

2003
LG Cup
LG Cup (snooker)